The Klamath black salamander (Aneides klamathensis) is a species of salamander in the family Plethodontidae. It is endemic to the western United States.

Taxonomy 
Previously, it was considered a population of the speckled black salamander (A. flavipunctatus). However, a 2019 study found A. flavipunctatus to represent a species complex and split multiple species off it, including the Klamath population, which was described as Aneides klamathensis.

Distribution 
This species inhabits the Klamath Mountains in northern California and southern Oregon. It ranges from southeast-central Humboldt and Trinity counties in California north to southern Josephine and Jackson counties in Oregon.

Description 
This species has a solid black base coloration overlaid by greenish-gray frosting that extends down the trunk. Its limbs are heavily spotted with white to cream-colored spots, but this are largely scattered on other dorsal surfaces.

References 

Aneides
Amphibians of the United States
Endemic fauna of the United States
Amphibians described in 2019
Taxa named by David B. Wake